Savelugu is one of the constituencies represented in the Parliament of Ghana. It elects one Member of Parliament (MP) by the first past the post system of election. It is located in the Northern Region of Ghana. The current member of Parliament for the constituency is Hajia Mary Salifu Boforo. Se was elected on the ticket of the National Democratic Congress (NDC) and won a majority of 6,434 votes more than candidate closest in the race to win the constituency election, becoming the MP. She had earlier represented the constituency in the 4th Republican parliament.

See also
List of Ghana Parliament constituencies

References 

Parliamentary constituencies in the Northern Region (Ghana)